Jong-hyuk, also spelled Jong-hyeok or Jong-hyok, is a Korean masculine given name. Its meaning differs based on the hanja used to write each syllable of the name. , regulations of South Korea's Supreme Court list the following hanja which may be registered for use in the given name Jong-hyuk:

 : six from the Basic Hanja for educational use and 14 from the Table of Hanja for Personal Name Use
 : one from the Basic Hanja for educational use and 11 from the Table of Hanja for Personal Name Use

People with this name include:

Lee Jong-hyuk (born 1974), South Korean actor
Joo Jong-hyuk (actor, born 1983), South Korean actor and singer, member of boy band Paran 
Kim Jong-hyeok (born 1983), South Korean football referee
Oh Jong-hyuk (born 1983), South Korean singer and actor, member of boy band Click-B
Choi Jong-hyuk (born 1984), South Korean football midfielder
Joo Jong-hyuk (actor, born 1991), South Korean actor
Kim Myoung-jun (born Kim Jong-hyuk, 1994), South Korean football centre back
Song Jong-hyok (born 1995), North Korean football midfielder
Jeon Jong-hyuk (born 1996), South Korean football goalkeeper

See also
List of Korean given names
Jang Jong-hyok (born 1980), North Korean football goalkeeper
Cha Jong-hyok (born 1985), North Korean football right-back
Hyon Jong-hyok (born 1993), North Korean football defender

References

Korean masculine given names